Don't Let Me Go (also titled The Healer and The Between) is a 2013 American fantasy horror film written and directed by Giorgio Serafini and starring Joel Courtney, Isabelle Fuhrman, James LeGros, and Peter Bogdanovich.

Cast
 Joel Courtney as Nick Madsen
 Isabelle Fuhrman as Michelle
 James LeGros as Chris Madsen
 Peter Bogdanovich as Man
 Natalia Dyer as Banshee
 LaDon Drummond as Ella
 Mariel Alliata Bronner as Ghost Girl
 Trace Adkins as Driver

Production
Filming occurred in North Carolina.

References

External links
 

American horror films
American fantasy films
Films shot in North Carolina
2010s English-language films
2010s American films